Art and Documentation is a scholarly journal on art published in the years 2009-2017 by the Art and Documentation Association in Lodz (Poland). Since 2018 the journal is published by Academy of Fine Arts in Gdansk. It appears twice a year. Scholarly articles are peer-reviewed. All content is published under the Creative Commons licenses. The journal is a platform aiming at shaping views, posing questions and initiating research. It gathers scholars, artists, art critics and curators. Art and Documentation focuses on works of an ephemeral nature, i.e. conceptual or post-conceptual works and related issues and documentation and documenting of contemporary art as well as creating art based on documentation. It also publishes primary sources - gallery timelines, manifestos, artists' statements etc. The journal's aim is to include research on art within the broader field of performance studies, strengthen the relationship between academic research on art and contemporary art practices, and combine theory and practice in a more direct way. This is reflected in the topics presented in the journal and the extended scope of research and methodologies that are becoming more diverse and interdisciplinary.

Editorial board: Łukasz Guzek (chief editor), Anka Lesniak (managing editor), Jozef Robakowski, Aurelia Mandziuk, Adam Klimczak, Anne Seagrave (English proofreading), Norbert Trzeciak (graphic design).

Board of scholars: Ryszard Kluszczyński, Kristine Stiles, Anna Markowska, Slavka Sverakova, Leszek Brogowski, Tomasz Załuski, Bogusław Jasiński, Tassilo von Blittersdorff, Cornelia Lauf, Iwona Szmelter, Hanna B. Hölling.

Articles are available at journal's webside and in databases: CEJSH, CEEOL, BazHum, EBSCO, ESCI, POL-index.

References

External links 
 Art and Documentation website

Contemporary art magazines
Arts journals
Polish-language journals
Academic journals published in Poland